The Philippine national cricket team is the men's team representing the Philippines in international cricket. It is organized by the Philippine Cricket Association (PCA) which became an affiliate member of the International Cricket Council (ICC) in 2003 The PCA became an associate member since 2017.

The Philippines were ranked at their career high 42nd in T20Is as per the rankings released by the International Cricket Council for Twenty20 International as of 3 May 2019.

History

In 2011, The national team made their Twenty20 debut when they competed at the East Asia-Pacific Division 2 in Samoa winning over Indonesia, the Cook Islands, Tonga and South Korea before conceding defeat to the host nation in the final. The tournament was the Philippines' first International Cricket Council (ICC)-sanctioned match. The tournament was part of a qualifying pyramid for the 2012 ICC World Twenty20 in Sri Lanka.

The Philippines then played at the 2014 ICC East Asia-Pacific Men's Championship in New South Wales, Australia and finished fifth among eight national teams. Indian expatriate, Awais Mohd became the first Philippine national team member to score a half-century in an ICC-sanctioned match while playing for the country in the EAP tournament.

At the 2017 ICC World Cricket League East Asia-Pacific Region Qualifiers, the Philippines finished fourth out of six nations, failing to qualify for Division Five.

The national team decided not to participate at the 2017 Southeast Asian Games as it seeks more Filipino players, sponsors and government support but plans to participate in the 2019 edition.

2018–present
They tried to attempt to qualify for the 2020 ICC World Twenty20 tournament in Australia with the Philippines as one of the co-hosts of the East Asia-Pacific Qualifier. They advanced to the Regional Finals in Papua New Guinea after finishing first among four participating teams at the qualifiers hosted at the cricket ground of the Emilio Aguinaldo College in December 2018 in Dasmariñas, Cavite. 

In April 2018, the ICC decided to grant full Twenty20 International (T20I) status to all its members. Therefore, all Twenty20 matches played between the Philippines and other ICC members since 1 January 2019 have been full T20Is. 

Philippines made its Twenty20 International debut on 22 March 2019, losing to Papua New Guinea by 133 runs in the 2018–19 ICC T20 World Cup East Asia-Pacific Qualifier at Amini Park, Port Moresby, Papua New Guinea The team would become inactive for three years due to the COVID-19 pandemic before featuring in the 2022 ICC Men's T20 World Cup qualifiers.

Home ground

The Philippine national team had the Manila Nomads Sports Club grounds in Parañaque as its home venue. When the Nomads' grounds closed, the national team moved its home to the cricket grounds of the Emilio Aguinaldo College in Dasmariñas, Cavite, the sole cricket venue in the country as of 2017.

Tournament history

ICC World Twenty20
 2020: Did not qualify

World Cricket League
 2017 EAP Region Qualifiers: 4th place

EAP Championship
 2011 Division Two: 2nd
 2013: Did not enter
 2014: 5th place

Southeast Asian Games
 2017: Did not enter

Players
Philippines squad for 2018–19 ICC World Twenty20 East Asia-Pacific Qualifier held at Papua New Guinea from 22–24 March 2019.
 Jonathan Hill
 Haider Kiani
 Kuldeep Singh
 Richard Goodwin
 Ruchir Mahajan
 Surinder Singh
 Karweng NG
 Henry Tyler
 Machanda Biddappa
 Grant Russ
 Daniel Smith
 Jason Long
 Vimal Kumar

Records and Statistics 

International Match Summary — Philippines
 
Last updated 24 February 2022

Twenty20 International 

 Highest team total: 109/8 v. Germany, 24 February 2022 at Oman Cricket Academy Ground Turf 2, Muscat.
 Highest individual score: 35, Daniel Smith v. Canada, 18 February 2022, and v. Germany, 24 February 2022, both at Oman Cricket Academy Ground Turf 2, Muscat.  
 Best individual bowling figures: 3/32, Surinder Singh v. Vanuatu, 23 March 2019 at Amini Park, Port Moresby.

Most T20I runs for Philippines

Most T20I wickets for Philippines

T20I record versus other nations

Records complete to T20I #1489. Last updated 24 February 2022.

Other records
For a list of selected international matches played by Philippines, see Cricket Archive.

See also
 List of Philippines Twenty20 International cricketers
Philippine women's national cricket team

References

External links 
International Cricket Council Member Profile – Philippines

Cricket in the Philippines
National cricket teams
Cricket
Philippines in international cricket